Rosa Graciela Castagnola de Fernández Meijide  (born 27 February 1931), better known as Graciela Fernández Meijide is an Argentine teacher, human rights activist and politician. She came to prominence by investigating the forced disappearances of thousands of people during the Dirty War. She later served as a deputy, senator, and government minister for the FrePaSo party.

Biography
Graciela Castagnola was born in Avellaneda just south of Buenos Aires, where she met her husband, Enrique Fernández Meijide, at a young age. They had a daughter and two sons, and she worked as a French language teacher. In 1976, her 16-year-old son, Pablo, was taken by the authorities in a night-time raid on the family apartment, along with his girlfriend, María Zimmermann, in what appears to be a case of mistaken identity (the girl's former boyfriend was a student activist also named Pablo). They were not seen again by their families.

Fernández Meijide campaigned for the rights of the families of the disappeared during the Dirty War of the 1970s. She lived in exile in Montreal for a period and joined the Permanent Assembly for Human Rights. At the return of democracy in 1983, she was appointed to head the depositions department of the National Commission on the Disappearance of Persons (CONADEP).

Political career
Although Fernández Meijide was approached by several parties after her high-profile work, it was not until the creation of the centre-left Broad Front that she started a political career, having seen the passing into law of the controversial 'Pardon Laws' (the Ley de Obediencia Debida and the Ley de Punto Final) that effectively ended further prosecution for those responsible for human rights abuses during the National Reorganization Process dictatorship (1976–83). She stood as a candidate for the Argentine Chamber of Deputies in 1991 on the center-left Broad Front ticket, albeit without success.

Fernández Meijide was first elected to Congress in 1993 as a Deputy for the City of Buenos Aires on the newly formed FrePaSo (Front for a Country in Solidarity) ticket. She was elected to the Argentine Senate in 1995 for the city. During this time the newly formed FrePaSo's popularity and her own grew. In 1997, she resigned her seat in the Senate and was elected a deputy once again – now for Buenos Aires Province – in a resounding victory over Justicialist Chiche Duhalde, greatly increasing her profile. FrePaSo joined with the Radical Civic Union (UCR) and several provincial parties to create the Alianza in opposition to President Carlos Menem, and she led the Alianza party list to a majority in the Lower House in the 1997 mid-term elections.

Ahead of the 1999 elections, Fernández Meijide ran in the Alianza presidential primary against UCR Senator Fernando de la Rúa, to whom she lost despite having been the front-runner in many polls. She declined to be de la Rúa's running mate and instead announced her candidacy for Governor of Buenos Aires Province; she lost to Justicialist Party nominee Carlos Ruckauf by 7 points, however.

De la Rúa, on the other hand, was elected President, and he appointed Fernández Meijide to his cabinet as Minister of Social Development and Environment. She was unable to put many of her social plans into action, however, due to lack of funds, and her popularity waned as the public's impatience grew. In a 2001 cabinet reshuffle brought on by economic and social crisis, the president made her chief of cabinet; she however resigned after a few days in protest at the government's economic policies. De la Rúa's government and the Alianza subsequently collapsed in 2001, after which both the UCR and FrePaSo backed the congressionally-appointed presidency of Eduardo Duhalde to remedy the country's economic crisis. Fernández Meijide afterward retired from active politics. Her Intimate History of Human Rights in Argentina was published in 2009.

See also
List of former Argentine Senators

References

Graciela Fernez Meijide: una mujer con temple de acero profile and interview, PDF format 
Buenos Aires Mayor to Lead Opposition in Argentina, New York Times, 1998-11-30

1931 births
Living people
People from Avellaneda
Argentine people of Italian descent
Argentine activists
Argentine women activists
Argentine exiles
Members of the Argentine Chamber of Deputies elected in Buenos Aires
Members of the Argentine Chamber of Deputies elected in Buenos Aires Province
Front for a Country in Solidarity politicians
Members of the Argentine Senate for Buenos Aires Province
People of the Dirty War
Women members of the Argentine Chamber of Deputies
Broad Front (Argentina) politicians
Women government ministers of Argentina
Women members of the Argentine Senate
Ministers of social welfare of Argentina